{{DISPLAYTITLE:C8H19N}}
The molecular formula C8H19N (molar mass: 129.24 g/mol) may refer to:

 Dibutylamine
 N,N-Diisopropylethylamine, or Hünig's base
 Octodrine

Molecular formulas